Martina Navratilova was the defending champion, but lost in the third round to Ann Grossman.

Amy Frazier won the title by defeating Grossman 6–1, 6–3 in the final.

Seeds
The first eight seeds received a bye into the second round.

Draw

Finals

Top half

Section 1

Section 2

Bottom half

Section 3

Section 4

References

External links
 Official results archive (ITF)
 Official results archive (WTA)

LA Women's Tennis Championships
1994 WTA Tour